Stopno is a Slovene place name that may refer to:

Stopno, Makole, a village in the Municipality of Makole, northeastern Slovenia
Stopno, Škocjan, a village in the Municipality of Škocjan, southeastern Slovenia